Phaplu Airport  is a domestic airport located in Phaplu, Solududhkunda  serving Solukhumbu District, a district in Province No. 1 in Nepal.

History
The airport was opened in October 1976 and later broadened by Sir Edmund Hillary to accommodate DHC-6 Twin Otter aircraft. The Civil Aviation Authority of Nepal shut down the airport in 2013 in order to pave the runway. The airport reopened one year later with a full blacktopped runway.

Facilities

As the airport lies within the approach of Lukla Airport, flights en route to Lukla often get diverted to Phaplu Airport.

Airlines and destinations

Gallery

References

External links
 
 Landing in Phaphlu - Nepal at YouTube
 Phaplu Landing at YouTube
 Airplane takeoff from Phaplu, Nepal at YouTube

Airports in Nepal
Buildings and structures in Solukhumbu District
1976 establishments in Nepal